The 2002 UCF Golden Knights football team represented the University of Central Florida in the 2002 NCAA Division I-A football season. Their head coach was Mike Kruczek, who was in his fifth season with the team. 2002 marked the Golden Knights first season in the Mid-American Conference, in the East Division. This was the first time UCF had joined a conference since ascending to the NCAA Division I Football Bowl Subdivision in 1996.

On opening day, UCF once again played up to a ranked opponent on the road, but failed to pull off the upset. Trailing 10–9 at halftime against Penn State, a near-disastrous third quarter saw the Golden Knights fall behind 20–9. In the fourth quarter UCF rallied. Quarterback Ryan Schneider capped off an 80–yard drive with a 6–yard touchdown pass to Tavaris Capers with 24 seconds to go. With the score 27–24, a failed onside kick attempt sealed the victory for the Nittany Lions.

UCF's first conference game came on September 20 against eventual MAC champion Marshall. With Thundering Herd quarterback Byron Leftwich faltering throughout the night, UCF largely failed to capitalize. Trailing 21–26 in the final three minutes, UCF intercepted Leftwich, and subsequently drove to the Marshall 26–yard line. Facing 4th & 3 at the Marshall 26, Ryan Schneider was picked off by Terence Tarpley. Marshall ran out the clock, and held on for the victory. The Knights first conference victory in the MAC came at Western Michigan on October 12. Finishing the season with a winning record (7–5 overall, 6–2 conference), UCF did not receive a bowl berth.

Schedule

References

UCF
UCF Knights football seasons
UCF Golden Knights football